Chalta Purza is a 1977 Bollywood action thriller film directed by Bhappi Sonie. The film stars Rajesh Khanna and Parveen Babi.

Cast
Rajesh Khanna as Amar Gupta 
Parveen Babi as Sheetal 
Rakesh Roshan as Inspector Sunil Verma 
Ranjeet as Ranjeet 
Ajit as Captain Rajendra Behl 
Asrani as Shankar / Ahmed 
Jankidas as Jankidas 
Dev Kumar as Jaggi 
Murad as Samuel Antonio 
Sudhir as Inspector Sharma
Dhumal

Plot
Rajesh Khanna plays the role of Amar, an unemployed person struggling in life, just because he believes in honesty. Ammar's eyes open when his mother dies in a car accident. He realizes that his mother could not be safe due to his honest ways. To improve his lifestyle, he joins the gang of the notorious criminal CAPTAIN, where he immediately becomes their favorite henchman. Things change for Amar when he learns that an old friend of his has joined the police force and has been assigned to nab CAPTAIN and his gang.

Soundtrack

External links
 

1977 films
1970s Hindi-language films
1970s action thriller films
Indian action thriller films
Films scored by R. D. Burman
Films directed by Bhappi Sonie